The Juno Award for Best Jazz Album was an award, presented by the Juno Awards to the year's best jazz album by a Canadian artist. It was presented from 1977 until 1993, following which it was discontinued and replaced with separate categories for Contemporary Jazz and Mainstream/Traditional Jazz.

Winners

References

Jazz
Jazz awards
Album awards